London Buses route 9 (Heritage) was a Transport for London contracted bus route in London that initially ran between the Royal Albert Hall and Aldwych before being extended from the Royal Albert Hall to Kensington High Street and shortened from Aldwych to Trafalgar Square. It was operated by First London and later Tower Transit with AEC Routemasters from November 2005 until July 2014.

History
To counter unfavourable media coverage of the withdrawal of London's classic AEC Routemaster fleet, Mayor of London Ken Livingstone promised to introduce a heritage Routemaster operation. After hopes that this would be operated commercially, it eventually materialised as tendered short workings on two existing routes, 9H and 15H. The route was initially operated by First London from Aldwych to the Royal Albert Hall, duplicating the eastern half of route 9. The route was criticised by the Liberal Democrats for missing out important tourist attractions such as Buckingham Palace, Big Ben and the British Museum.

This approach ensured passengers with other mobility problems would have alternatives to the Routemasters. The two heritage routes began operation on 14 November 2005. The Routemasters selected had been rebuilt in the early 2000s by Marshall Bus with new engines, windows and lighting.

On 13 November 2010, route 9H was extended westward from the Royal Albert Hall to Kensington High Street and curtailed at its eastern end to Trafalgar Square. The extension was at the urging of the Royal Borough of Kensington and Chelsea, which wanted to boost the number of visitors to Kensington High Street.

On 22 June 2013, route 9H was included in the sale of First London's Westbourne Park garage to Tower Transit. Route 9H ceased operating on 25 July 2014 because the arrival of New Routemasters on route 9 reduced the patronage of route 9H. Peter Bradley, head of the route 9H consultation, said: "We are considering the removal of this service because it costs more than £1m a year to operate, owing in large part to the upkeep of the 60-year-old buses, and a low level of use by passengers. This money will be re-invested in London’s bus network".

Route
Kensington High Street Holland Road
High Street Kensington station 
Royal Albert Hall
Knightsbridge station 
Hyde Park Corner station 
Green Park station 
Pall Mall
Trafalgar Square

See also

 List of bus routes in London
London Buses route 15 (Heritage) - the second heritage service that operated from 2005 until 2019

References

External links

Route 9H gallery

Bus routes in London
Transport in the City of Westminster
Transport in the Royal Borough of Kensington and Chelsea
2005 introductions
2005 establishments in England
2014 disestablishments in England